A list of films produced by the Ollywood film industry based in Bhubaneswar and Cuttack in the 1980s:

References

1980s
Ollywood
Films, Ollywood